The Jewish Question, also referred to as the Jewish problem, was a wide-ranging debate in 19th and 20th-century European society that pertained to the appropriate status and treatment of Jews.

Jewish question may also refer to:
 The Jewish Question, a 1912 book  by Arno Clemens Gaebelein
 The Jewish Question in its Historical Context and its Proposed Solution, a 1917 book  by Josef Ringo
 The Jewish Question, an 1843 essay by Bruno Bauer
 On The Jewish Question, an 1844 commentary by Karl Marx on Bruno Bauer's 1843 The Jewish Question
 A World Without Jews (1959 book), by Dagobert D. Runes (1959), a substantially re-titled imprint, compilation, and translation into English of On The Jewish Question (1844)
 The Jewish Question in the Classroom, a 1937 book by Julius Streicher
 The Jewish Question over Five Centuries, a 1939 book by Julius Streicher
 Final solution to the Jewish question, 1942, the Nazis' plan for genocide against the European Jewish population during World War II
  Reflections on the Jewish Question, a 1946 essay by Jean-Paul Sartre; original title: Réflexions sur la question juive
 The Jewish Question, a 1995 book  by Yevgenia Albats